Westside High School is a consolidated regional high school in Clear Fork, West Virginia serving the western half of Wyoming County, West Virginia. It opened in 2002 and consolidated the former Oceana High School and Baileysville High School, also taking in about one-third of the attendance area of the former Glen Rogers High School, which had been merged into Oceana several years earlier.

The school was originally to be named "Wyoming West" to match the county's other consolidated school, Wyoming East High School, but students voted on the Westside name.

References

Educational institutions established in 2002
Public high schools in West Virginia
Schools in Wyoming County, West Virginia
2002 establishments in West Virginia